Bad Street Brawler, originally released for home computers as Bop'n Rumble in North America and as Street Hassle in Europe, is a 1987 video game by Beam Software. Versions were released for the ZX Spectrum and Commodore 64 and MS-DOS by Melbourne House and Mindscape with a NES version following in 1989. The NES version was one of only two games specifically designed for use with Mattel's Power Glove.

Gameplay

The player plays the character Duke Davis (the back of the box calls him Duke Dunnegan), who goes from stage to stage beating up gangsters that get in his way, dressed in a yellow tank top, sunglasses, and yellow pants. He is described as a former punk rocker and the "world's coolest" martial artist.

Before the start of the next stage, quotes are introduced to entertain the player (such as "Never trouble trouble until trouble troubles you"). The player fights a variety of enemies, such as gorillas and circus dwarves who throw hammers at the player (old ladies in the computer versions who throw purses at the player). There are 15 stages in this game. Moves include the "bull ram" attack and "trip" move.

Development 
Coverage of the Nintendo version was set to be announced at the Winter CES 1988 by Mindscape, but was abruptly pulled at the Summer CES 1988, and a conversion of the arcade game Paperboy took its place.

Reception
Electronic Gaming Monthlys Seanbaby placed it as number 16 in his "20 worst games of all time" feature.

Reviews
ASM (Aktueller Software Markt)
GamersHell.com
Your Sinclair
ASM (Aktueller Software Markt)
Your Sinclair
Sinclair User
Game Freaks 365
Questicle.net
Retro Game Reviews
Just Games Retro
8-bit Central Retro Gaming
Bad Game Hall of Fame

See also
 List of beat 'em ups
 Super Glove Ball

References

External links
 

1987 video games
Action video games
Beat 'em ups
Commodore 64 games
DOS games
Nintendo Entertainment System games
Side-scrolling beat 'em ups
Video games developed in Australia
ZX Spectrum games
Mindscape games